Lights is the fifth studio album by British trip hop progressive and alternative group Archive, released in 2006.

Track listing
 "Sane" – 4:26
 "Sit Back Down" – 6:36
 "Veins" – 4:01
 "System" – 4:01
 "Fold" – 4:37
 "Lights" – 18:28
 "I Will Fade" – 3:08
 "Headlights" – 3:32
 "Programmed" – 5:45
 "Black" – 2:52
 "Taste of Blood" – 4:35

Charts

References

2006 albums
Archive (band) albums
East West Records albums